Rajbari may refer to:

 Rajbari District, a district of Dhaka Division in Bangladesh
 Rajbari Sadar Upazila, an upazila subdistrict of Rajbari District